Dusty is a given name and possibly a nickname. It may refer to:

 Dusty Bonner (born 1979), American former football quarterback
 Dusty Drake, American country singer
 Dusty Dvoracek (born 1983), American football player
 Dusty Hughes (playwright) (born 1947), English playwright and director
 Dusty Jonas (born 1986), American high jumper
 Dusty Limits, Australian-born cabaret singer and comedian
 Dusty Noble (born 1984), South African former rugby union footballer
 Dusty Rychart (born 1978), Australian-American basketball player
 Dusty Springfield, British pop singer

See also 
 Dustie Waring (born 1985), American guitarist
 Dusty (nickname)